Helmut Berger (born Helmut Steinberger; 29 May 1944) is an Austrian actor, known for his portrayal of narcissistic and sexually-ambiguous characters. He was one of the stars of the European cinema in the late 1960s and 1970s, and is regarded as a sex symbol and pop icon of the period.

He is most famous for his work with Luchino Visconti, particularly in his performance as King Ludwig II of Bavaria in Ludwig, for which he received a special David di Donatello award, and his performance in The Damned for which he was nominated for a Golden Globe Award.

Early life and education
Berger was born in Bad Ischl, Austria, into a family of hoteliers. After receiving his Matura, Berger initially trained and worked in this field, even though he had no interest in gastronomy or the hospitality industry. At age eighteen, he moved to London, England, where he did odd jobs while taking acting classes. After studying languages at University of Perugia in Italy, Berger moved to Rome.

Career

1964 to 1976 

He first met the film director Luchino Visconti in 1964. Visconti gave him his first acting role in the film Le streghe (The Witches, 1967) (in the episode "La Strega Bruciata Viva"), but he gained international prominence as the amoral Martin von Essenbeck in Visconti's The Damned (1969). In that film, in what is perhaps his best-known scene, he pretends to be Marlene Dietrich in the film The Blue Angel (1930). It was followed by the title role in the Oscar Wilde adaption Dorian Gray (1970) and a leading role in the Oscar-winning Italian drama film The Garden of the Finzi-Continis (1970). In Visconti's Ludwig (1972), Berger portrays Ludwig II of Bavaria from his youth to his dissolute final years. Romy Schneider starred alongside him in the film. This performance earned him a David di Donatello award. In 1974, Berger starred with Burt Lancaster in Visconti's Conversation Piece. The story of Conversation Piece is often considered as an allegory of the personal relationship between Berger and Visconti. On several occasions Berger mentioned this film as his favorite.

In the following, he played leading roles in international productions such as Ash Wednesday (1973) alongside Elizabeth Taylor and Henry Fonda. Another film was The Romantic Englishwoman (1975) alongside Michael Caine and Glenda Jackson. He also appeared in Tinto Brass's controversial film, Salon Kitty with Ingrid Thulin in 1976. Well-known photographers including Helmut Newton, Mary Ellen Mark, and David Bailey published series of pictures of him. Andy Warhol made polaroids of him and produced serigraphs. Berger was also, in 1970, alongside his then-girlfriend Marisa Berenson, the first man on the cover of Vogue.

1976 to 1999 
The death of his partner Luchino Visconti in 1976 plunged him into a personal crisis. Exactly one year after Visconti died, Berger tried to commit suicide but was found in time to be saved. In the following time the abuse of drugs and alcohol shadowed his acting career. In 1980 Berger was cast by Claude Chabrol as Fantômas before he went to America to work in television in the role of Peter De Vilbis in nine episodes (1983–1984) of the American prime time soap opera Dynasty, which he said he did only for money. He would later say he was "crying on the way to the set but laughing on the way to the bank". This was his last appearance in a television series. He continued working in the US on various projects, most notably starring in Code Name: Emerald in 1985. In Europe, he acted the TV-miniseries The Betrothed in 1989.

In 1990, Berger appeared in The Godfather Part III as corrupt banker Frederick Keinszig. He later appeared in the music video to Madonna's song "Erotica" in 1992, and also appeared in Madonna's book Sex. In 1993, Berger reprised his role as King Ludwig II. in the critically acclaimed film Ludwig 1881. Throughout the second half of the 1990s, he concentrated mainly on European productions, acting in films directed by Christoph Schlingensief, Yves Boisset and many others.

In 1997, Quentin Tarantino included some archive footage of the film Beast with a Gun in his film Jackie Brown and thanked Berger in the closing credits for his performance.

2000s to present 

From the early 2000s to 2009, Berger largely withdrew from the acting world, moving to Salzburg to his mother who was in need of care. She died in 2009. Since then, he has acted in bigger film productions again.

In 2012, Schwarzkopf & Schwarzkopf Verlag published Helmut Berger – A Life in Pictures, a coffee table book about his life, featuring many previously unreleased photographs of his life and films plus essays in German, English, Italian and French. The book was well received by the press.

In the thriller film Iron Cross (2009), Berger played Shrager, an aging character believed to be an old SS commander responsible for murdering Jews during World War II. In the early 2010s, Berger starred in two films directed by Peter Kern – Blutsfreundschaft (shown at the 60th Berlin International Film Festival (2010)), and Mörderschwestern (2011). In 2014, Berger appeared in Saint Laurent as old Yves Saint Laurent for which he was "celebrated" at Cannes Film Festival. The short film Art!, in which Berger had a starring role, had its world premiere at Paris Independent Film Festival 2015. He starred in the role of Professor Martin in the 2016 film Timeless directed by Alexander Tuschinski.

In 2015, Austrian filmmaker Andreas Horvath released a feature-length documentary about Helmut Berger called Helmut Berger, Actor. The film premiered at the Venice Film Festival. In the magazine Artforum American film director John Waters chose Helmut Berger, Actor as the Best Motion Picture of the year 2015. Berger later filed a lawsuit against Horvath.

On February 22, 2018, the premiere of Albert Serra's play, Liberté, starring Helmut Berger and Ingrid Caven was performed at the Volksbühne theatre in Berlin. It was the first stage role in Berger's career. In 2019, another documentary film Helmut Berger, meine Mutter und ich was released, dealing with his personality and an attempted comeback.

After suffering several bouts of pneumonia, Berger announced his retirement from acting in November 2019 and that he wanted to spend his remaining years away from the public.

Awards and honours
In 1969, Berger was nominated for a Golden Globe Award for his role in The Damned, and in 1973, he won a David di Donatello – the Italian equivalent of an Academy Award – for his performance in Ludwig.

In 2007, he received a special Teddy Award at the 57th Berlin International Film Festival (2007) for his overall professional achievements.

In 2010, Berger received two Prix Lumières at the Lumière Film Festival in Lyon and also the "golden key" of the city.

In 2011, he received a Kristián Award, awarded at the Czech film festival Febiofest "for Contributions to World Cinema".

Personal life
Berger is openly bisexual. He was in relationships with his director and mentor Luchino Visconti and actress Marisa Berenson. Berger married Italian writer and model Francesca Guidato on 19 November 1994. As of 2010, they live separately. Berger lived for many years in Rome, but returned to Salzburg in the 2000s to take care of his elderly mother.

In the late 1960s and 1970s, Berger was seen as the "it boy of the European jet set". According to his 1998 autobiography Ich. Die Autobiographie, affairs reportedly included Rudolf Nureyev, Britt Ekland, Ursula Andress, Nathalie Delon, Tab Hunter, Florinda Bolkan, Linda Blair, Marisa Mell, Anita Pallenberg, Marilù Tolo, Jerry Hall, and both Bianca and Mick Jagger. Miguel Bosé writes about his affair in his autobiography.<ref>Bosé, M. (2021). El hijo del Capitán Trueno [Captain Trueno's Son]. Barcelona/Mexico: Planeta. pp. 371-394. ISBN 978-84-670-6424-7 ISBN 978-607-07-8069-1</ref>

Since the 1980s, Berger's private life was also in the news for his struggles with alcohol and drugs, sometimes resulting in eccentric and controversial television appearances. In 2013, Berger appeared on Ich bin ein Star – Holt mich hier raus!, the German version of I'm a Celebrity...Get Me Out of Here!. He had to leave for health reasons after only two days.

Reception

Filmography(director in parentheses; all films except as noted) 1967: Le streghe (The Witches) (Luchino Visconti) as Young man at Hotel (segment "La Strega Bruciata Viva")
 1968:  (Antonio Leonviola) as Dario
 1969:  (Maurizio Liverani) as Aldo
 1969: The Damned (Luchino Visconti) as Martin Von Essenbeck
 1970: Dorian Gray (Massimo Dallamano) as Dorian Gray
 1970: The Garden of the Finzi-Continis (Vittorio De Sica) as Alberto
 1971: Un beau monstre (Sergio Gobbi) as Alain Revent
 1971: The Bloodstained Butterfly (Duccio Tessari) as Giorgio
 1972: La colonna infame (Nelo Risi) as Arconati
 1973:  (Otto Schenk) as Der Junge Herr / The Youngman / Alfred
 1973:  (Sergio Gobbi) as Kosta
 1973: Ludwig (Luchino Visconti) as Ludwig
 1973: Ash Wednesday (Larry Peerce) as Erich
 1974: Conversation Piece (Luchino Visconti) as Konrad Huebel
 1975: Order to Kill (José G. Maesso) as Clyde Hart
 1975: The Romantic Englishwoman (Joseph Losey) as Thomas
 1976: Salon Kitty (Tinto Brass) as Helmut Wallenberg
 1976: Victory at Entebbe (Marvin Chomsky) as Wilfried Böse
 1977: Beast with a Gun (Sergio Grieco) as Nanni Vitali
 1977: Paperback 1978: The Greatest Battle (Umberto Lenzi) as Lt. Kurt Zimmer
 1978: The Fifth Commandment (Duccio Tessari) as Bernhard Redder
 1979: Le rose di Danzica (Alberto Bevilacqua) as Baron Erich von Lehner
 1980:  (Claude Chabrol, Juan Luis Buñuel) (TV miniseries) as Fantômas / Nanteuil / Gurn / Valgrand
 1980: Eroina (Massimo Pirri) as Marco
 1981: Mia moglie è una strega (Castellano & Pipolo) as Asmodeo
 1982:  (Károly Makk) as Boris
 1983: Femmes (Tana Kaleya) as Helmut
 1983: Veliki Transport (V. Bulajic) as Colonel Glassendorf
 1982: Victoria! La gran aventura de un poble (Antoni Ribas) as Tinent Rodríguez Haro
 1983: Victoria! 2: El frenesì del 17 (Antoni Ribas) as Tinent Rodríguez Haro
 1983–1984: Dynasty (television series) as Peter De Vilbis
 1984: Victoria! 3: La razon y el arrebato (Antoni Ribas) as Tinent Rodríguez Haro
 1985: Code Name: Emerald (Jonathan Sanger) as Ernst Ritter
 1988: Faceless (Jess Franco) as Docteur Flamand
 1988: Act of Revenge (Salvatore Nocita)
 1989: La Puritana (Nini Grassia) as Carlo Martora-Doctor
 1990: The Godfather Part III (Francis Ford Coppola) as Frederick Keinszig
 1992: Adelaide (Lucio Gaudino) as Gilas
 1993: Boomtown (Christoph Schrewe) as Richard Schwarzer
 1993: Ludwig 1881 (F. Dubini / D. Dubini) as King Ludwig II
 1995: L'affaire Dreyfuss (Yves Boisset) as Schwartzkoppen
 1996: L'ombra del faraone (S. Ben Barka)
 1996: Teo (Cinzia TH Torrini) as Signor Mastrovito
 1997:  (Christoph Schlingensief) as Himself
 1997: Last Cut (Marcello Avallone)
 1999: Under the Palms (M. Kruishoop) as David
 2004: Honey Baby (Mika Kaurismäki) as Karl / Hades
 2005: Damals warst du still (R. Matsutani) as Fabian Plessen
 2009: Zapping Alien (V. Zeplichal) as Jack / 00Y / Georg II
 2009: Blutsfreundschaft (Peter Kern) as Gustav Tritzinsky
 2009: Iron Cross (Joshua Newton) as Shrager / Vogler
 2011: Mörderschwestern (Peter Kern) as Dr. Schleier
 2013: The Devil's Violinist (Bernard Rose) as Lord Burghersh
 2014: Saint Laurent (Bertrand Bonello) as Yves Saint Laurent en 1989
 2015: Helmut Berger, Actor (Andreas Horvath), documentary film as himself
 2016: Timeless (Alexander Tuschinski) as Professor Martin
 2019: Helmut Berger, meine Mutter und ich (Valesca Peters), documentary film as himself
 2019: Freedom (Albert Serra) as Baron von Walchern

See also
 List of Austrian film actors

Bibliography
 Coriando, Paola-Ludovika (March 2006).  "La poesia del volto: ritratto di Helmut Berger attore viscontiano".  Cineforum. Issue #452.
 Berger, Helmut, with Heuer, Holde: Ich, Die Autobiographie. Ullstein, Berlin 1998, .
 Coriando, Paola-Ludovika: Helmut Berger – Ein Leben in Bildern. Schwarzkopf & Schwarzkopf, Berlin 2012, .
 Berger, Helmut, with Heuer, Holde: Helmut Berger, autoportrait''. Seguier, 2015,

References

External links 

 
 Article by Alexander Tuschinski about filming with Helmut Berger in 2015. (PDF; 1 MB)

1944 births
Living people
Austrian male film actors
Austrian male television actors
20th-century Austrian male actors
21st-century Austrian male actors
Bisexual male actors
Austrian LGBT actors
People from Bad Ischl
Kristián Award winners
Ich bin ein Star – Holt mich hier raus! participants